Cutthroat Island is a 1995 adventure swashbuckler film directed by Renny Harlin and written by Robert King and Marc Norman from a story by Michael Frost Beckner, James Gorman, Bruce A. Evans and Raynold Gideon. It stars Geena Davis, Matthew Modine and Frank Langella. It is a co-production between the United States, France, Germany and Italy.

It had a notoriously troubled and chaotic production involving multiple rewrites and recasts. It received generally negative reviews from critics, who praised its high production values, action sequences, shooting locations and musical score, but criticized its script, acting, and unrealistic stunts. It was one of the biggest box office bombs in history, with losses of $147 million when adjusted for inflation. It is listed in the Guinness World Records as the biggest box-office bomb of all time, and significantly reduced the bankability and Hollywood production of pirate-themed films until 2003's Pirates of the Caribbean: The Curse of the Black Pearl. Its failure caused the closing of Carolco Pictures.

Plot
In 1668 Jamaica, Morgan Adams having escaped a sting operation to capture her with aid of her father's boatswain Mr. Glasspoole and Bowen, hunts down her uncle and fellow pirate Dawg Brown, who has captured her father, Black Harry. Black Harry has one of three pieces of a map to a huge stash of gold on the remote Cutthroat Island. Dawg has another piece, having stolen it from the corpse of a third brother, Richard, while a fourth brother, Mordechai, has the last piece. Harry refuses to give Dawg his piece and escapes with Morgan's help, but not before being mortally wounded by Snelgrave, Dawg's one armed and one eyed first mate. A dying Harry reveals to his daughter the location of the map piece: on his scalp. At the same time in Port Royal, during a ball hosted by its corrupt Governor Ainslee, thief William Shaw is captured by Captain Trotter, having fleeced several guests of their valuables.

Morgan, now captain of the Morning Star, sets out for the treasure. Unable to translate the map, they go to Port Royal to find a translator. Learning that Shaw, up for slave auction, is fluent in Latin, Morgan wins the auction. When she is recognized from her wanted poster and barely escapes with Shaw, Ainslee vows to find her, either to arrest her or form a partnership for half her profits. He enlists the help of chronicler John Reed, who often follows pirates to write his books.

The crew finds Mordechai in Spittlefield Harbor. Before they can learn where the second piece is, Dawg appears; a fight ensues, during which Mordechai is mortally wounded, Morgan is shot, and Shaw secretly finds the map piece and keeps it to himself. Escaping on the Morning Star, Morgan collapses from her wound, but is saved by Shaw, a self-proclaimed doctor. The two start a romance. Morgan figures out that the words on the two map pieces, when read backwards, spell out half the coordinates to the island.

Dawg pursues the Morning Star in his own ship, the Reaper. Morgan directs hers toward a coral reef and a gale. Shaw manages to determine the location of Cutthroat Island with his and Morgan's map pieces, but is caught and thrown in the brig. During the storm, Reed sends a carrier pigeon revealing their location to Ainslee. Scully leads a mutiny, marooning Morgan and those loyal to her in a boat. The tide takes them straight to Cutthroat Island.

As Morgan goes after the treasure, Shaw escapes and steals the last piece from Dawg. Shaw falls into quicksand and Morgan, realizing he has the piece, frees him. Together, they find the treasure, only for it to be stolen by Dawg, forcing them to jump off a cliff into the sea.

After regaining consciousness, Shaw finds Reed, who leads him into a trap set by Dawg, Ainslee and Scully, who have joined forces and intend to split the treasure, with Ainslee intending to pardon the pirates by re-classifying them as privateers. As Shaw is captured and they make their way out to sea with the gold, Morgan sneaks aboard the Morning Star and retakes it from Scully and the mutineers, throwing them overboard to swim back to Cutthroat Island, while overpowering Captain Trotterwho has become disappointed by Ainslee's actions.

Dawg deduces that Morgan has retaken control of Morning Star. He convinces Ainslee to hang Shaw from the yardarm of Reaper, causing the Morning Star crew to act prematurely. A sea fight ensues, during which Shaw escapes and Ainslee, his men, and Reed are killed by cannon fire. Realizing his future in the army is over, Captain Trotter saves Mr. Blair by killing a fellow soldier before turning on the rest of his remaining comrades, while Mr. Glasspoole tricks Snelgrave into entangling himself in the anchor then dropping it to the depths. Morgan boards the Reaper and blows out the ship's bottom to get to the treasure. She then kills Dawg in a duel and saves Shaw from the sinking Reaper.

Morgan had attached a marker barrel to the treasure beforehand, allowing them to retrieve it, and the newly rich crew sets sail for Madagascar.

Cast

In addition, Angus Wright plays Captain Trotter (lieutenant in the film's dialogue), while the film's director, Renny Harlin, has an uncredited cameo as a pirate with a rifle.

Production

Development

When the film was produced, Geena Davis and director Renny Harlin were married. Harlin convinced producer Mario Kassar to cast Davis, who was until then known for light comedies, hoping it would turn her into an action-adventure star. Carolco, already deeply in debt when the film entered preproduction, initially budgeted $60 million for the project and pinned its hopes for survival on its success. To fund it, the cash-starved company cancelled its only other project in production, Crusade starring Arnold Schwarzenegger, costing it $13 million. It also sold a $20 million interest in Paul Verhoeven's Showgirls, Last of the Dogmen, and Stargate, and aggressively marketed Cutthroat Island to overseas distributors, promising them it would be a sure hit.

Casting
Michael Douglas originally agreed to play Shaw under two conditions: filming had to start immediately because he was available only for a limited time, and his character had to have the same amount of screen time as Davis. Douglas eventually pulled out, claiming that Davis's role was expanded at his character's expense, while Davis wanted to quit when Douglas did, but was contractually obligated to finish the film.

After Douglas quit, Harlin was so preoccupied with trying to find a male lead that set construction and script work were done without his input. Consequently, Harlin did not like what he saw when shooting was set to begin, leading to expensive rebuilding and rewriting.

Tom Cruise, Keanu Reeves, Russell Crowe, Liam Neeson, Jeff Bridges, Ralph Fiennes, Charlie Sheen, Michael Keaton, Tim Robbins, Daniel Day-Lewis and Gabriel Byrne all turned down the role of Shaw before Modine agreed to do the role, partly due to his experience as a fencer.

Oliver Reed was originally cast for a cameo as Mordechai Fingers, but was fired after getting in a bar fight and attempting to expose himself to Davis while intoxicated. George Murcell eventually took his place.

Filming

Shooting was delayed for various reasons, allowing the budget to spiral out of control. When Harlin fired the chief camera operator following a dispute, more than two dozen crew members quit. In addition, broken pipes caused raw sewage to pour into the water tank where the actors were supposed to swim. Harlin spent $1 million of his own money to rewrite the script, as Carolco Pictures was in so much debt that they could not afford to pay further.

The first week into production, the film's original cinematographer, Oliver Wood, fell off a crane and into one of the water tanks, breaking his leg; he had to be replaced by cinematographer Peter Levy. Wood's contributions to the film would be acknowledged in the closing credits.

The film was shot on location in Malta and Thailand. Indoor scenes were shot at Mediterranean Film Studios in Kalkara, Malta, and models were shot at the Paddock Tank at Pinewood Studios, in Iver Heath, Buckinghamshire, England. Harlin required actors to do their own stunts whenever possible. While promoting the film, Davis appeared on talk shows with clips of her doing stunts over and over (including one take where she fell out of a window too soon, rolled down the roof and under a carriage) and described the bruises and injuries she sustained while filming.

Music

The film's orchestral score was composed by John Debney. It is one of the film's aspects that has been critically acclaimed, compared with the classic works of Erich Wolfgang Korngold.

Release

Box office
Cutthroat Island had a total production budget of $92–98 million million (though some put the figure as high as $115 million). It debuted at No. 13 at the US box office, and the total U.S. gross was only $10 million. In 2014, the Los Angeles Times listed the film as one of the most expensive box office flops of all time, while the Guinness World Records listed it as the biggest box-office bomb of all-time. The list of biggest box-office bombs shows it is still no better (ranges vary) than the fifth worst money loser of all time, allowing for inflation, as of 2023.

Critical reception
On Rotten Tomatoes the film has a 39% rating based on 41 reviews, with an average rating of 4.90/10. The site's consensus reads: "Cutthroat Island may aspire towards the earnest thrills of classic swashbucklers, but a distinct lack of charm and stilted script make this adventure a joyless hodgepodge of the pirate genre's flotsam and jetsam." On Metacritic the film has a score of 37% based on reviews from 20 critics, indicating "generally unfavorable reviews". Critics were also unimpressed with the lack of chemistry between the leading actors, the one-dimensional villain, the unrealistic stunts (particularly a scene where Adams and Shaw jump through a scaffolding several stories high and come out unharmed) and the incoherent script. Audiences surveyed by CinemaScore gave the film a grade "B-" on scale of A to F.

Todd McCarthy from Variety said: "What seemed like a dubious proposition on paper plays even more dubiously onscreen, as Cutthroat Island strenuously but vainly attempts to revive the thrills of old-fashioned pirate pictures. Giving most of the swashbuckling opportunities to star Geena Davis, pic does little with its reversal of gender expectations and features a seriously mismatched romantic duo in Davis and Matthew Modine." Time Out London commented that "we get Geena Davis doing the all-action honours, and a hotchpotch script that seems to think pirate movies are so funny in themselves the need for more humour is superfluous. The plot's well worn". Janet Maslin of The New York Times said that "It's not possible to believe that Ms. Davis is the highly respected captain of a pirate ship, and it's not even fun to try." Empire gave the film two stars out of five stating "It's mindless entertainment, but its critical and commercial failure doomed the pirate genre to a watery grave" complimenting though the locations and the set pieces stating that "The film is at its best in the gorgeous locations and the huge (we're talking Harlin - Die Hard 2, Cliffhanger - huge) set-pieces, concluding in a wild sea battle that is more John Woo on water".

Roger Ebert of the Chicago Sun-Times gave the film a three-out-of-four-star rating, commenting: "This is, in short, a satisfactory movie – but it doesn't transcend its genre, and it's not surprising or astonishing. I saw it because that was my job and, having seen it, I grant its skill, and award it three stars on that basis. But unless you're really into pirate movies, it's not a necessary film." Susan Wloszczyna from USA Today stated: "If the sight of half-naked, tattooed sailors firing cannons at each other shivers your timbers, climb aboard. Even passable pirate movies don't sail by every day," awarding the film a 2.5 star rating out of 4.

Harlin was nominated for a Golden Raspberry Award for Worst Director for his work on the film, but "lost" to Paul Verhoeven for Showgirls.

Legacy 
In a radio interview in 2011, Harlin discussed the film's box office failure. He pointed out that Carolco was in ruin before shooting even began, but had to make the film since financing from foreign investors was already in place. MGM, the film's distributor, was in the process of being sold and thus could not devote itself into financing a marketing campaign for the film. Carolco filed for Chapter 11 bankruptcy a month before Cutthroat Islands release.

In another interview, Matthew Modine said that other factors contributing to the production costs running out of control were Harlin always having three cameras rolling at the same time; and Harlin and Davis had several cases of V8 Vegetable Juice shipped out to the set in Malta for themselves. Towards the end of the shooting, an entire room was found to be full of unopened juice, so it had to be served to everybody.

The failure of Cutthroat Island is also credited with significantly reducing the bankability and Hollywood production of pirate-themed films, which recovered only with the production of Disney's Pirates of the Caribbean: The Curse of the Black Pearl in 2003. Even at the time, the pirate genre was already not particularly popular due to the high costs of shooting, and even today, very few pirate movies outside of Pirates of the Caribbean franchise exist.

Scott Mendelson of Forbes stated on the film's 25th anniversary that the film, along with Aeon Flux, contributed to the failure of women-led films in the box office before the 21st century.

Video game

A video game was published by Acclaim Entertainment and released for the major platforms of the time (such as the Super NES, Sega Genesis, and Game Boy) to tie in with the film. It loosely follows the events of the film.

See also

Other pirate-themed box office bombs:
 The Pirate Movie (1982) 
 Yellowbeard (1983)
 Nate and Hayes (1983)
 Pirates (1986)

References

Bibliography

Further reading 
 Prince, Stephen (2000) A New Pot of Gold: Hollywood Under the Electronic Rainbow, 1980–1989. University of California Press, Berkeley/Los Angeles, California.

External links
 
 

1995 films
1990s English-language films
English-language French films
English-language German films
English-language Italian films
1995 action comedy films
1990s action adventure films
1995 romantic comedy films
American action comedy films
American action adventure films
American romantic comedy films
French action comedy films
French historical adventure films
French romantic comedy films
German action comedy films
German historical adventure films
German romantic comedy films
Italian action adventure films
Italian romantic comedy films
Films scored by John Debney
Films directed by Renny Harlin
Films produced by Laurence Mark
Films set in the Caribbean
Films set in the 1660s
Films shot in England
Films shot in Malta
Films shot in Thailand
Pirate films
American swashbuckler films
Treasure hunt films
Films shot at Pinewood Studios
Carolco Pictures films
Metro-Goldwyn-Mayer films
Artisan Entertainment films
1990s American films
1990s French films
1990s German films